Michalis Vakalopoulos (born 26 June 1990 in Leiderdorp) is a Dutch-Greek professional footballer who used to play as a defender for PSV Eindhoven, Vitesse Arnhem and for SC Veendam.

External links
 Voetbal International

1990 births
Living people
Dutch footballers
SC Veendam players
Eerste Divisie players
People from Leiderdorp
Dutch people of Greek descent
Association football defenders
Footballers from South Holland